Chelis gratiosa is a moth in the family Erebidae. It was described by Grigory Grum-Grshimailo in 1890. It is found in the western Tien Shan, the Pamir-Alay, Kyrgyzstan, Turkestan, Hissar, Trans-Alai, the Pamir Mountains, Pakistan, Kashmir and western China.

This species was moved from the genus Palearctia to Chelis as a result of phylogenetic research published in 2016.

Subspecies
 Chelis gratiosa gratiosa (Alai, Tajikistan, north-western Pamirs)
 Chelis gratiosa caroli Dubatolov, 1996 (Chatkal, Kirghizskii Alatau)
 Chelis gratiosa flavoala Dubatolov, 1996 (Zeravshan, Turkestan, mountain ranges of Hissar)
 Chelis gratiosa kashmirica Ferguson, 1985 (Kashmir)
 Chelis gratiosa lochmatteri (Reich, 1933) (Pakistan: Karakorum)
 Chelis gratiosa postflavida (Hampson, 1894) (Kashmir)
 Chelis gratiosa rupicola (Grum-Grshimailo, 1890) (eastern Trans-Alai, eastern and south-western Pamirs)
 Chelis gratiosa sarezica Dubatolov & Gurko, 2003 (Tajikistan)
 Chelis gratiosa sarycola de Freina, 1997 (Sarykol Mountains)
 Chelis gratiosa sergei Dubatolov, 1996 (south-eastern Terskei Alatau)

References

Moths described in 1890
Arctiina